George Batson (3 November 1912 – 29 April 1996) was an  Australian rules footballer who played with St Kilda in the Victorian Football League (VFL).

Notes

External links 

1912 births
1996 deaths
Australian rules footballers from Victoria (Australia)
St Kilda Football Club players
Warragul Football Club players